North–South railway may refer to:

 North–South railway, Germany
 North–South Railway (Vietnam)
 SAR North–South Railway line, in Saudi Arabia
 North–South express railway (Vietnam)
 North and South Railway, a planned American railroad between Casper, Wyoming and Miles City, Montana
 North–South Transport Corridor, a freight route between Asia and Europe
 North–South connection, through Brussels, Belgium
North–South Commuter Railway, a planned commuter railway in the Philippines

See also

 North–South line (disambiguation)